Kostecki (feminine: Kostecka; plural: Kosteccy) is a Polish surname. It may refer to:
 Brodie Kostecki (born 1997), Australian racing driver
 Dawid Kostecki (1981–2019), Polish boxer
 Jake Kostecki (born 2000), Australian racing driver
 Joanna Sakowicz-Kostecka (born 1984), Polish tennis player
 John Kostecki (born 1964), American sailor
 Józef Kostecki (1922–1980), Polish actor
 Kurt Kostecki (born 1998), Australian racing driver
 Nepomucena Kostecka (1807–1847), Polish actress
 Robert Kostecki (born 1969), Polish wrestler

See also
 
 

Polish-language surnames